When Seconds Count is the sixth studio album by the American rock band Survivor, released in October 1986. The album included the hit single, "Is This Love", which peaked at #9 in the US on the Billboard Hot 100 chart in early 1987. The album reached #49 on the Billboard 200 album chart.

This is one of the many Survivor albums briefly taken out of print in 2009. However, it was remastered and reissued in 2011 and distributed by Rock Candy Records.

Track listing 

Rock Candy CD reissue only

Personnel 
Survivor
 Jimi Jamison – lead vocals, backing vocals
 Jim Peterik – keyboards, additional backing vocals
 Frankie Sullivan – guitars, backing vocals
 Stephan Ellis – bass
 Marc Droubay – drums

Additional musicians
 Mike Moran – synthesizers
 Bill Cuomo – additional synthesizers
 Tom Kelly – backing vocals
 Tommy Shaw – additional backing vocals

Production 
 Ron Nevison – producer, engineer
 Frankie Sullivan – producer
 Jim Peterik – associate producer (4)
 Phil Bonanno – engineer
 Mike Clink – engineer
 David DeVore – engineer
 Allen Abrahamson – second engineer
 Jim Bineen – second engineer
 Dan Harjung – second engineer
 Stan Katayama – second engineer
 Steve Klein – second engineer
 Julian Stoll – second engineer
 Toby Wright – second engineer
 Mike Reese – mastering
 Jimmy Watchel – album art coordination
 Thirst – art direction
 Rick Valicenti – cover design
 Corinne Pfister – cover photography
 Tom Vack – cover photography
 Randee St. Nicholas – portrait photography
 Ron Larson – hand tinting
 John Baruck – management
 Tom Consolo – management

Studios
 Recorded at One On One Studios (North Hollywood, CA); Record Plant and Rumbo Recorders (Los Angeles, CA); Manzanita Studio (Valyermo, CA); Can-Am Studios (Tarzana, CA); Royal Recorders (Lake Geneva, WI); Ripe Studios (London, UK).
 Mastered at The Mastering Lab (Hollywood, CA).

Charts

References 

1986 albums
Survivor (band) albums
Albums produced by Ron Nevison
Albums with cover art by Jimmy Wachtel
Scotti Brothers Records albums